Woman on the Run: The Lawrencia Bembenek Story is a 1993 American drama film written and directed by Sandor Stern. It is based on the 1992 book Woman on Trial by Lawrencia Bembenek. The film stars Tatum O'Neal, Bruce Greenwood, Peggy McCay, Colin Fox, Kenneth Welsh and Catherine Disher. The film aired on NBC in two parts on May 16, 1993, and on May 17, 1993.

Plot

Cast 
Tatum O'Neal as Lawrencia Bembenek
Bruce Greenwood as Fred Schultz
Peggy McCay as Virginia Bembenek
Colin Fox as Joe Bembenek
Kenneth Welsh as Don Eisenberg
Catherine Disher as Judy Zess
Richard Hughes as Russ
Alan Jordan as Prosecuting Attorney
Ron White as Det. Rogers
Saul Rubinek as Bill Bryson
Alex McArthur as Nick Gugliatto
Barbara Eve Harris as Zena Jackson
Ari Magder as Sean Schultz
Graham Losee as Shannon Schultz
Gail Webster as Christine Schultz
David Ferry as Detective Fell
Ted Simonett as Judge Skwieraski
Nancy Anne Sakovich as Kim
Dan Redican as Marty Blaine
Chantal Craig as Sherry Wonaker
Brenda Bazinet as Amy Bryson
Trudy Desmond as Playboy Club Singer
Doug Samuels as Eddie
Emmanuel Mark as Jack
Angelo Pedari as Tony
Paul Haddad as Corey Fenton
Graham McPherson as Sergeant McFee
Thomas Rickert as Bill
Marv Allemang as Ted Boxner
Pixie Bigelow as Mrs. Zess
Matt Cooke as Lieutenant
Carlton Watson as Neelan
Jane Moffat as Carla Dishman
Garfield Andrews as Matt Krone
Victor Garber as Frank Marrocco
Robert Joy as Sheldon Zenner
Linda Griffiths as Maggie Friel
Patrick Galligan as John Callaghan
Helene Clarkson as Marybeth
Norwich Duff as John McClinton
A. Frank Ruffo as Louie Rebezes
David Eisner as Ron Lester
Kathy Greenwood as Sylvia Bonner
Linda Goranson as Connie Bell
Elizabeth Hanna as Diane Hanson
Carolyn Scott as Florek
Tamar Lee as Dominque
Roger Dunn as Detective Logan
Janine Manatis as Dr. Swales
Elizabeth Lennie as Mary Selby
Sharon Dyer as Anne
Mary Lu Zahalan as Maureen Lacy
Philip Williams as Jake Lipner
Janet Burke as Debbie

References

External links
 

1993 television films
1993 films
1990s English-language films
American drama television films
1993 drama films
NBC network original films
Films directed by Sandor Stern
Canadian drama television films
1990s American films
1990s Canadian films
English-language Canadian films